is a subway station on the Tokyo Metro Marunouchi Line in Bunkyo, Tokyo, operated by the Tokyo subway operator Tokyo Metro.

Lines

Station layout
The station consists of two open-air side platforms on the first basement ("B1F") level serving two tracks. The station entrance is located at ground level.

Platforms

History

The station facilities were inherited by Tokyo Metro after the privatization of the Teito Rapid Transit Authority (TRTA) in 2004.

Passenger statistics
In fiscal 2011, the station was used by an average of 66,404 passengers daily.

Surrounding area
 Atomi University Bunkyo campus
 Ochanomizu University
 Takushoku University Bunkyo campus
 University of Tsukuba Bunkyo campus

Located two stops from the large centre of Ikebukuro, Myogadani Station is in a central location but serves the mainly residential area of Koishikawa and is seldom busy except at rush hour. Surrounding the station is a small commercial area with a few shops, supermarkets, izakayas and restaurants. It is close to several of Tokyo's universities, including Ochanomizu University and University of Tsukuba. It is also close to the Koishikawa Botanical Garden, which is affiliated with the University of Tokyo.

The residential area just to the north of Kasuga-dori Avenue, on which the station is situated, is laden with parks and green belts, which is rare for such a central neighborhood. Tokyo's printing district is another point of interest in the area. Just south of the Koishikawa Botanical Garden is a neighborhood full of many tiny scale printing shops that are simply houses converted into printing enterprises, many of them situated on narrow streets which sometimes become congested with forklifts and trucks delivering paper and printed material.

See also
 List of railway stations in Japan

References

External links

  

Railway stations in Tokyo
Tokyo Metro Marunouchi Line
Railway stations in Japan opened in 1954